Samuel Presbiter (fl. 1200) was a theologian, a student of William de Montibus at the cathedral school in Lincoln, England.

He is the creator of several works he designates 'Collecta', preserved in two manuscripts from Bury St Edmunds Abbey, now Oxford, Bodleian Library, MS Bodley 860 and Cambridge, Pembroke College, MS 115. The common origin of these manuscripts suggests that he was also a monk at the abbey. His works typically consist of poems summarizing his learning, created for mnemonic purposes, together with prose extracts. Four of his works have been published in full or in part: his versification of Psalm 1, his records of William de Montibus's lectures on the Psalms, Collecta ex diuersis auditis in scola Willelmi de Monte (a rare record of ‘collations’ given at a cathedral school), and De oratione dominica (a versification of Hugh of St Victor's De quinque septenis).

Bibliography 

 
 
 

Year of birth unknown
Year of death unknown
13th-century English Roman Catholic theologians
English male non-fiction writers
13th-century Latin writers